Wallacetown is a small town in Southland, in the South Island of New Zealand. Wallacetown is to the west of Invercargill, on high ground between the Makarewa and Ōreti rivers, near the Ōreti's estuary. Both rivers are popular for trout and whitebait fishing. It is considered to be a satellite town of Invercargill. It is served by State Highway 99, which skirts the town's northern edge.

Demographics
Wallacetown is described as a rural settlement by Statistics New Zealand.

Wallacetown had a population of 717 at the 2018 New Zealand census, an increase of 36 people (5.3%) since the 2013 census, and an increase of 105 people (17.2%) since the 2006 census. There were 270 households. There were 369 males and 342 females, giving a sex ratio of 1.08 males per female, with 168 people (23.4%) aged under 15 years, 111 (15.5%) aged 15 to 29, 339 (47.3%) aged 30 to 64, and 93 (13.0%) aged 65 or older.

Ethnicities were 91.2% European/Pākehā, 10.9% Māori, 0.8% Pacific peoples, 2.9% Asian, and 2.9% other ethnicities (totals add to more than 100% since people could identify with multiple ethnicities).

Although some people objected to giving their religion, 57.7% had no religion, 34.3% were Christian and 1.7% had other religions.

Of those at least 15 years old, 48 (8.7%) people had a bachelor or higher degree, and 141 (25.7%) people had no formal qualifications. The employment status of those at least 15 was that 330 (60.1%) people were employed full-time, 60 (10.9%) were part-time, and 24 (4.4%) were unemployed.

Wallacetown statistical area

The statistical area had a population of 1,173 at the 2018 New Zealand census, an increase of 15 people (1.3%) since the 2013 census, and an increase of 117 people (11.1%) since the 2006 census. There were 441 households. There were 609 males and 567 females, giving a sex ratio of 1.07 males per female. The median age was 39.3 years (compared with 37.4 years nationally), with 243 people (20.7%) aged under 15 years, 204 (17.4%) aged 15 to 29, 591 (50.4%) aged 30 to 64, and 138 (11.8%) aged 65 or older.

Ethnicities were 90.3% European/Pākehā, 11.3% Māori, 1.8% Pacific peoples, 3.8% Asian, and 2.8% other ethnicities (totals add to more than 100% since people could identify with multiple ethnicities).

The proportion of people born overseas was 8.4%, compared with 27.1% nationally.

Although some people objected to giving their religion, 53.2% had no religion, 37.6% were Christian, 0.5% were Muslim and 1.5% had other religions.

Of those at least 15 years old, 96 (10.3%) people had a bachelor or higher degree, and 231 (24.8%) people had no formal qualifications. The median income was $38,800, compared with $31,800 nationally. 153 people (16.5%) earned over $70,000 compared to 17.2% nationally. The employment status of those at least 15 was that 576 (61.9%) people were employed full-time, 108 (11.6%) were part-time, and 33 (3.5%) were unemployed.

Education

References

Populated places in Southland, New Zealand